The first season of the Romanian reality talent show Vocea României Junior premiered on February 26, 2017 on Pro TV with Andra, Inna and Marius Moga as coaches.

The season finale aired on April 9, 2017. Maia Mălăncuș mentored by Marius Moga, was declared winner of the season.

Coaches and presenters

Hosts
In July 2016 Mihai Bobonete and Robert Tudor were confirmed hosts for the Voice of Romania Junior.

Coaches
In June 2016 pop singer and judge at Românii au talent, Andra, singer, dancer and philanthropist, Inna and R'n'B musician, composer and adult show coach, Marius Moga were confirmed coaches for the Voice of Romania Junior.

Selection process

Pre-selections took place in the following cities:

Teams
Colour key:
  Winner
  Finalist
  Eliminated in the Semi-final
  Eliminated in the Battles

Blind Auditions
Colour key

Episode 1 (February 26)
The first episode of The Blind Auditions aired on February 26, 2017.

Episode 2 (March 5)
The second episode of the Blind Auditions aired on March 5, 2017.

Episode 3 (March 12)
The third episode of the Blind Auditions aired on March 12, 2017.

Episode 4 (March 12)
The final episode of the Blind Auditions aired on March 19, 2017.

Battle rounds
After the Blind auditions, each coach had nine contestants for the Battle rounds. The Battles rounds aired on March 26. Coaches began narrowing down the playing field by training the contestants. Each battle concluding with the respective coach eliminating the two contestants.
Colour key

Show details

Results summary
Team's colour key
 Team Andra
 Team Moga
 Team Inna
Result's colour key
 Artist received the most public votes
 Artist was eliminated 
 Finalist

Live Shows

Semi-final (April 2)
The semi-final aired on April 2.

Final (April 9)
The final show aired on April 9. This week, the three finalists performed a solo song, a duet with a special guest and a duet with their coach. The public vote determined the winner.

Ratings

References

Romania
2017 Romanian television seasons